Benoît Benvegnu (born January 18, 1985 in Montauban) is a French football goalkeeper currently playing for Vannes OC in the French Ligue 2.

Career
Born in Montauban, Benvegnu played youth football for Lafrançaise and Castelmaurou before joining Toulouse FC in 1999. He represented France at all youth levels, and helped the team to a runner's up finish at the 2002 UEFA European Under-17 Championship. Benvegnu joined Toulouse's senior side, but never was the club's first-choice goalkeeper. He made his only Ligue 1 appearances when Nicolas Douchez was suspended during a brief spell of January 2007.

References

External links 

1985 births
Living people
French footballers
Ligue 1 players
Ligue 2 players
Toulouse FC players
Amiens SC players
Association football goalkeepers
Vannes OC players